Enzo Maggio (10 October 1902 – 13 July 1978) was an Italian actor.

Born Vincenzo Maggio in Naples into a family of actors, Maggio made a long apprenticeship in the avanspettacolo theaters before and during the Second World War. On stage, he was specialized in macchiette and in the impersonation of the comedian Larry Semon (known in Italy as Ridolini). After the war, he decided to devote himself to cinema and had a very prolific career even if often cast in character roles.

Maggio often worked on stage with his brothers and sisters Dante, Beniamino, Pupella and Rosalia.

Partial filmography

 A Dog's Life (1950) - Gigetto
 È arrivato il cavaliere (1950) - Guardia personale del ministro
 Milano miliardaria (1951) - Il parruchiere tifoso
 Viva il cinema! (1952)
 The White Sheik (1952) - Furio
 La nemica (1952)
 Rimorso (1952)
 Siamo tutti inquilini (1953) - Prestanome
 Riscatto (1953)
 A Husband for Anna (1953) - Il fotografo
 The Walk (1953)
 If You Won a Hundred Million (1953) - Beniamino (segment "Il tifoso")
 Lasciateci in pace (1953)
 Cose da pazzi (1954) - Gnauli's assistant
 Ulysses (1954) - (uncredited)
 Prima di sera (1954) - Fantali - the tailor
 Tripoli, Beautiful Land of Love (1954) - Un attore del Caffé-Concerto
 Peppino e la vecchia signora (1954)
 Napoli piange e ride (1954) - Fisarmonica player
 Il cantante misterioso (1955) - Gino
 Graziella (1955) - Servitore del console (uncredited)
 I giorni più belli (1956) - Il tizio
 Due sosia in allegria (1956)
 I vagabondi delle stelle (1956)
 Cantando sotto le stelle (1956) - Cameriere di trattoria
 The Pirate and the Slave Girl (1959) - Candela
 Ferdinando I, re di Napoli (1959) - The Escort of Pat and Cordelia
 My Friend, Dr. Jekyll (1960) - Cameriere del night club
 Caccia al marito (1960) - Salvatore Gargiulo - the hotel valet (uncredited)
 Adua and Her Friends (1960) - Calypso - Stefano's colleague
 Ghosts of Rome (1961) - Fricandò
 The Joy of Living (1961) - Prisoner #888
 Black City (1961) - Il ministro Crescenzo
 Accroche-toi, y'a du vent! (1961)
 Zorro and the Three Musketeers (1963)
 Revenge of the Musketeers (1963)
 Hercules and the Black Pirates (1964)
 3 Avengers (1964) - Manina
 Bullets and the Flesh (1964) - Cliente Bar
 Super Seven Calling Cairo (1965)
 Star Black (1966)
 The Three Fantastic Supermen (1967) - La Squadra Acrobatica Italiana
 Io non protesto, io amo (1967) - Felice
 Kill Me Quick, I'm Cold (1967)
 Nel sole (1967) - School attendant
 I due vigili (1967) - Remo Cesaroni
 I 2 deputati (1968)
 Ombre roventi (1970)
 Brother Outlaw (1971)
 Il furto è l'anima del commercio!?... (1971) - Agente Lo Cascio
 Er Più – storia d'amore e di coltello (1971) - Old Garibaldian
 Quando gli uomini armarono la clava e... con le donne fecero din don (1971)
 Pistol Packin' Preacher (1971) - Doctor
 Trinity and Sartana Are Coming (1972) - Jeremiah (uncredited)
 Gli altri racconti di Canterbury (1972) - Beppe (segment 'Il pescatore')
 Flatfoot (1973) - Gennarino
 Seven Nuns in Kansas City (1973) - Gin
 Flatfoot in Hong Kong (1975) - Gennarino (final film role)

References

External links 
 

1902 births
1978 deaths
Italian male film actors
Male actors from Naples
Italian male stage actors
20th-century Italian male actors